Greenwood Park may refer to:

 Greenwood Park (Des Moines), Iowa
 Greenwood Park, Harare, Zimbabwe
 Greenwood Park (Tennessee), Nashville, Tennessee
 Greenwood Memorial Park (disambiguation)
 Greenwood Urban Wetlands, also known as Greenwood Park (Orlando, Florida)